The Right to an effective remedy is the right of a person whose human rights have been violated to legal remedy. Such a remedy must be accessible, binding, capable of bringing perpetrators to justice, provide appropriate reparations, and prevent further violations of the person's rights. The right to an effective remedy guarantees the individual the ability to seek remedy from the state directly rather than through an international process. It is a practical means of protecting human rights on the state level and requires the state to not just protect human rights de jure but also in practice for individual cases. The right to an effective remedy is commonly recognized as a human right in international human rights instruments.

The right to an effective remedy is expressed in Article 8 of the Universal Declaration of Human Rights, Article 2 of the International Covenant on Civil and Political Rights, Article 13 of the European Convention on Human Rights, and Article 47 of the European Union Charter on Fundamental Rights.

Asylum seekers
The right to an effective remedy has been invoked in cases of asylum seekers in which the right has been held to prevent a state from deporting an asylum seeker before adjudicating the seeker's application for asylum, and that upon rejection of an asylum claim, the claimant must have a practical ability to appeal by being granted sufficient time and access to legal representation. Courts have not generally found that the state needs to provide a lawyer, even when an asylum seeker cannot afford one, provided that a lawyer is not necessary to access an effective remedy. Courts have found that an excessively formal process may violate the right to an effective remedy, especially when a lawyer is not provided.

European Union
In European Union law, the right to an effective remedy applies beyond human rights to all rights provided for by EU law that are enforced in the courts of member states.

Torture
The United Nations Human Rights Committee has stated that in cases of torture, the right to an effective remedy requires states to investigate allegations of torture, prosecute perpetrators, provide compensation to victims, and prevent similar violations from occurring again. The principle of the right to an effective remedy is expressed in article 14 of the United Nations Convention against Torture.

See also
 Human rights
 Right to a fair trial
 Impartiality

References

Further reading
 
 

Human rights